Argent were  an English rock band founded in 1969 by keyboardist Rod Argent, formerly of the Zombies. They had three UK top 40 singles: "Hold Your Head Up", which reached number five and spent 12 weeks on the chart, "Tragedy" (number 34), and "God Gave Rock and Roll to You" (number 18). Two of their albums charted in the UK: All Together Now, which peaked at number 13 in 1972, and In Deep, which spent one week at number 49 in 1973.

History 
Rod Argent put together Argent just as his former band The Zombies's posthumous single "Time of the Season" was becoming a worldwide hit in 1969. Argent had enjoyed considerable success with The Zombies but wanted his new outfit to become part of the burgeoning progressive rock scene. Indeed, his new band employed much heavier rhythms and a generally weightier sound, but also continued the minor keys and complex lyrics of The Zombies, often by Argent's writing with former Zombie bassist Chris White. Guitarist and vocalist Russ Ballard also developed strong melodies and hit singles, writing a string of FM staples. The band was completed by bassist Jim Rodford and drummer Bob Henrit. Lead vocal duties were shared between Ballard, Rodford, and Argent.

Their first album, Argent, was critically acclaimed, if not a massive seller. It was a solid start and contained the song "Liar", which was subsequently covered by Three Dog Night. 1971's Ring of Hands was their second album and feaured the minor hit "Sweet Mary". All Together Now was their third album, released in 1973. It featured the song that they are best remembered for: "Hold Your Head Up", which was a top 5 hit in both UK and the US charts.

Their next album, In Deep, contained two more hits in "God Gave Rock and Roll to You" and "It's Only Money". 1974's Nexus did not have any songs the band considered to be a potential hit; Rod Argent's writing dominated the album, with Ballard only contributing 3 of the album's 9 songs. The album's centerpiece, "The Coming of Kohoutek", was inspired by that year's appearance of the comet of the same name. Uninspired by this change and seeking a vehicle for his prodigious songwriting, Ballard left after the album's release to pursue a successful career as a solo artist. Ballard's departure was followed by the release of the live album Encore, whose sound quality is considered poor.

The band regrouped as a quintet with the addition of young virtuoso guitarist John Grimaldi and guitar/vocalist John Verity. Both of their final albums, Circus and 1975's Counterpoints, were poorly received and failed to sell, though their final concert tours were well attended. In 1975, John Grimaldi left the band. While Rod Argent considered whether to continue Argent, the remaining members (Henrit, Rodford and Verity) became Phoenix.

The original Argent lineup reunited at the High Voltage Festival in Victoria Park, London on 25 July 2010, and undertook a short five-date concert tour in December 2010, with gigs in Frome, Southampton, Wolverhampton, Leamington Spa, and London.

Argent also reunited for a five-show tour from January to February 2012, before performing one last show at the Waterside Theatre in Aylesbury as part of a benefit concert, on 2 June 2013, supporting the Zombies, on a bill that also included Marillion members Steve Hogarth and Steve Rothery.

Rodford died after a fall on 20 January 2018, at age 76.

Band members
 Rod Argent – keyboards, backing and lead vocals (1969–1976, 2010, 2012, 2013)
 Bob Henrit – drums (1969–1976, 2010, 2012, 2013)
 Russ Ballard – guitar, lead vocals (1969–1974, 2010, 2012, 2013)
 Jim Rodford – bass guitar, backing vocals (1969–1976, 2010, 2012, 2013; died 2018)
 John Verity – guitar, lead vocals (1974–1976)
 John Grimaldi – guitar (1974–1976; died 1983)

Timeline

Songs
Argent's biggest hit was the Rod Argent and Chris White composition "Hold Your Head Up", featuring lead vocals by Russ Ballard, from the All Together Now album, which, in a heavily edited single form, reached No. 5 in the US. It sold over one million copies, and was awarded a gold disc. By 2005, all albums, including compilations, have been re-released on CD, except Counterpoints.

The sound of the band was a mix of rock and pop, but also covered more progressive rock territory in songs like "The Coming of Kohoutek", an instrumental from their Nexus album. When Ballard left the band after Encore, they took an even more progressive/fusion turn with their final Epic album Circus and then signed to a new record label (RCA) for the final 1975 album Counterpoints. By 2005, all albums, including compilations, have been re-released on CD, except Counterpoints.

Legacy
Argent recorded the original version of "God Gave Rock and Roll to You", written by Russ Ballard, which was covered by Kiss in 1991 under the name "God Gave Rock 'n' Roll to You II", and featured prominently at the end of the film Bill & Ted's Bogus Journey. The song also became a Contemporary Christian rock anthem and was twice covered by the Christian Rock band Petra, in 1977 (on the album Come and Join Us) and again in 1984 (on the album Beat the System), with new verses.

Some of Ballard's compositions became hits when they were covered by other artists, including Rainbow ("Since You Been Gone", from the album Down to Earth, and "I Surrender", from the album Difficult to Cure), Kiss, Petra, Hello, Santana, and more recently the Brazilian metal band Oficina G3. The Russ Ballard song "Liar", on Argent's first album, became a hit for Three Dog Night in 1971 and was also released as a single, ten years later, by Graham Bonnet (former Rainbow vocalist, who sang the vocal on "Since You Been Gone"), taken from his debut album Line-Up.

Fish (former lead singer of Marillion) recorded a version of "Hold Your Head Up" for his 1993 album Songs from the Mirror, a selection of his favourite songs. The American band Phish play an instrumental version of "Hold Your Head Up", usually as a transition into a "joke song" by drummer Jon Fishman. "Hold Your Head Up" was covered in 1987 by the band 20/Twenty and (in the same year) by Australian group the Party Boys. Mother Love Bone recorded a cover of "Hold Your Head Up" in 1989. Their version was released on a promotional only 7" vinyl in 1989. It was reissued on 7" vinyl in 2014 as a limited edition Black Friday Record Store Day release on Stardog/Republic Records. The band Jellyfish opened most of their shows with an abbreviated version of "Hold Your Head Up".

Discography

Studio albums

Live albums

Compilation albums
The Best of Argent - An Anthology (Epic, 1976)
Hold Your Head Up (1978)
Music from the Spheres (1991)
Greatest: The Singles Collection (2008)
Argent: Original Album Classics [A collection of the band's first five albums in miniature album sleeves] (2009)
God Gave Rock and Roll to You: The Greatest Hits (2010)
Hold Your Head Up: The Best of Argent (2022)

Singles

See also

References

External links

English hard rock musical groups
English pop rock music groups
English progressive rock groups
Epic Records artists
Musical groups established in 1968
Musical groups disestablished in 1976
1968 establishments in England
1976 disestablishments in England